Eteobalea sumptuosella is a moth of the  family Cosmopterigidae. It is found in the Mediterranean Region from Spain to Turkey, Morocco and Tunisia, Ukraine, southern Russia, the Caucasus, the Middle East, eastwards to Kazakhstan, Turkmenistan and Afghanistan.

Adults are on wing from early June to end of August.

References

External links
Notes on the Cosmopterigidae (Lepidoptera) of Afghanistan and Jammu & Kashmir, India with descriptions of two new species

Moths described in 1855
Moths of Asia
sumptuosella
Moths of Europe
Taxa named by Julius Lederer